Mouhammad Mpezamihigo born (23 July 1954) is a Ugandan Agriculturalist, Chair of Senate and the current Vice Chancellor of Kampala International University in Uganda.

Education 

He attended Kigezi High School for both his O-Level and A-Level. 
Mpezamihigo obtained his Bachelor of Science in Forestry and Master of Science in Agriculture, both from Makerere University and Kampala Uganda. 
He holds a Ph.D. in Horticulture and Landscape from the University of Reading in the United Kingdom.

Career 

Mouhammad Mpezamihigo is the current Vice Chancellor of Kampala International University. At the time of his appointment, Mpezamihigo was serving as a lecturer at Faculty of Science, Department of Biological Sciences and Environmental Science, Master of Science and in some post-graduate programs at the Islamic University in Uganda from 2005 to 2015.

He is also a chairperson at Kampala International University in Tanzania.

Awards and recognition 

In 2015, Mpezamihigo received the Education Leadership Award under the World Education Congress Global Awards in Mumbai, India. He has also received a recognition award from the Uganda National Council of Education (NCHE) for the period 2007–2017.

Publications 

Haruna Kigongo and M. Mpezamihigo (2013). Factors Affecting Agro-Marketing in Budaka District,  LAP Lambert Academic Publishing; Paper back 80 Pages.

Aisha Namukwaya and M. Mpezamihigo (2013). Exploring Electronic Learning for Distance Education in Uganda,  LAP Lambert Academic Publishing; Paper back 56 Pages.

Other considerations 

Mpezamihigo serves on the Islamic University in Uganda main scholarship committee and on the Alimiyya Sajjabi Foundation Scholarship Board.

References 

1954 births
Living people